So Far Gone is the third mixtape by Canadian rapper Drake. It was released on February 13, 2009, under his October's Very Own label. The mixtape proved to be a major catalyst in the launching of Drake's career on an international scale, and was universally well received by professional critics and hip-hop fans alike.

The tracks "Best I Ever Had" and "Successful" were released as singles from the mixtape, and attained unexpected success on the US Billboard Hot 100. The mixtape was promoted with a release party in Toronto with Drake and LeBron James. Artists including Omarion, Lloyd, Lykke Li, Lil Wayne and Bun B provided guest vocals on the release. The mixtape helped launch the careers of producers 40 and Boi-1da, whose contributions to the musical direction of the mixtape were applauded by critics.

On February 15, 2019, the mixtape was released on commercial streaming services for the first time, commemorating its tenth anniversary.

Background
In an interview with Complex, Drake explains: "The whole tape extends from one of my closest friends Oliver. One night we were having a discussion about women and the way we were talking about them, it was so brazen and so disrespectful. He texted me right after we got off the phone and he was like, 'Are we becoming the men that our mothers divorced?' That's really where the cover comes from, too. It's just this kid in pursuit of love and money. We're good guys, I'm friends with some real good people and for him to even text me after we got off the phone it just showed we have a conscience. But sometimes you just get so far gone, you get wrapped up in this shit. The title has a lot of meanings—as the way we carry ourselves, the way we dress, the way people view us, not to sound cocky, it's just that feeling that we're just distanced in a good way. You’re just elevating past the bullshit and past all the shit that you used to be a part of and you're not that proud of, you're just so far gone."

Composition

Music

The mixtape's music was characterized by atmospheric keyboards, minor keys, snare drum, synth lead, smooth piano, live instruments, down tempo and mid tempo tracks, sparse and minimalist beats, and atmospheric chords. In a Complex interview, Drake's primary producer, Noah "40" Shebib, said that 808s & Heartbreak was an influence on the mixtape's atmospheric sounds.

Lyrics
Typically, lyrics in So Far Gone address his relationships with women, gaining fame, past struggles, and creates metaphors for the struggles of others ("Houstatlantavegas", a stripper, "November 18th", the city of Houston etc.) Many of the more upbeat songs also include themes of braggadociosness, ego, wealth, the music industry, confidence around women and sexual experiences.

Singles
"Best I Ever Had" was released as the first single, in 7 months prior to the release of the EP as a digital download from the So Far Gone mixtape. The song was eventually released as an official single on June 16, 2009. The single charted for 24 weeks while eventually peaking at number 2 on the US Billboard Hot 100. The single also managed to peak at number one on both the Billboard R&B/Hip-Hop Songs Chart and the Billboard Rap Songs Chart, thus becoming Drake's first number one hit on both of these charts. The song was certified 2× platinum by the Recording Industry Association of America (RIAA) indicating sales of over 2,000,000 copies in the United States.

"Successful" was released as the second single from So Far Gone. The single managed to peak at number 17 on the US Billboard Hot 100 and spent a total of 18 weeks on the chart. The song also reached the Top 5 on both the R&B/Hip-Hop and Rap charts peaking at number 3 and number 2 respectively. It was certified gold by the Recording Industry Association of America (RIAA) indicating sales of over 500,000 copies in the United States.

Reception

The mixtape was well received. It currently holds a score of 81 out of 100 on Metacritic, indicating "universal acclaim." RapReviews.com gave a positive review of the mixtape and commented on it by saying "So Far Gone is unquestionably one of the most cohesive, atmospheric hip hop records in recent memory--which is almost the antithesis of what one expects from a mixtape." The Boston Globe gave the mixtape a positive score and commented by saying "His materialism threads throughout So Far Gone (champagne flutes, girls, BlackBerrys, more girls), but he chases that with soft touches of humor and honesty." Pitchfork reviewed the mixtape positively and said "So Far Gone still scans as one of the most compulsively listenable mixtapes of a great year for mixtapes." Slant Magazine gave the mixtape a mixed review, but commended Drake's effort, "For a beginner, even one whose big-time endorsements seem to have cemented a promising start, So Far Gone is a pretty brave effort, and Drake's ability to juggle standard bling-and-bluster narratives with intelligent narratives bodes well for his future".

Accolades
 MTV's Hottest Mixtape of The Year
 Complexs No. 3 Best Albums of 2009
 Complexs No. 5 Best Mixtape Album of The Decade

Commercial performance 
So Far Gone debuted at number five on the Billboard 200, with 45,000 equivalent album units earned in the week ending February 21, 2019, ten years after its release.

Track listing

Notes
  signifies a songwriter that is not listed on music streaming services.

Sample Credits
 "Lust for Life" contains a sample of "Ideas as Opiates", written by Roland Orzabal, as performed by Tears for Fears.
 "Let's Call It Off" contains a sample of "Let's Call It Off", written by Peter Morén, Björn Yttling and John Eriksson, as performed by Peter Bjorn and John.
 "November 18th" contains a sample of a chopped-and-screwed version of "Da Streets Ain't Right", written by Jermaine Dupri, as performed by Kris Kross, and remixed by Robert Davis; and "Pimp tha Pen", written by Marcus Edwards, as performed by Lil' Keke.
 "Pimp tha Pen" contains a sample of "Pocket Full of Stones", written by Bernard Freeman and Chad Butler, as performed by UGK.
 "Da Streets Ain't Right" contains a portion of "Warning", written by Christopher Wallace and Osten Harvey, as performed by the Notorious B.I.G.; and embodies a portion of "Talking in Your Sleep", written by George Canler, Wally Palamarchuk, Mike Skill, Jimmy Marinos and Peter Solley, as performed by the Romantics.
 "Warning" contains a sample from "Walk On By", written by Burt Bacharach and Hal David, as performed by Isaac Hayes.

 "Ignant Shit" and "A Night Off" contain samples of "Ignorant Shit", written by Shawn Carter, Justin Smith and Dwight Grant, as performed by Jay-Z and Beanie Sigel.
 "Ignorant Shit" contains a sample of Between the Sheets, written by Marvin Isley, O'Kelly Isley, Ernie Isley, Ronald Isley, Rudolph Isley and Chris Jasper, as performed by The Isley Brothers.

 "Say What's Real" contains a sample of "Say You Will", written by Kanye West, Jeff Bhasker, Dexter Mills, Jay Jenkins, Malik Jones and Benjamin McIldowie, as performed by Kanye West.
 "Little Bit" contains a sample of "Little Bit", written by Lykke Zachrisson and Björn Yttling, as performed by Lykke Li.
 "Best I Ever Had" contains a sample from "Fallin' in Love (again)", written by Dan Hamilton, as performed by Hamilton, Joe Frank & Reynolds; and portions of "Do It for the Boy", written in part by Nakia Coleman.
 "Unstoppable" contains a sample of "Unstoppable", written by John Hill, Thomas Pentz and Santi White, as performed by Santigold.
 "Uptown" contains elements and excerpts of "Uptown Girl", written by Billy Joel.
 "Bria's Interlude" contains a sample of "Friendly Skies", written by Missy Elliott and Timothy Mosley, as performed by Missy Elliott.
 "Friendly Skies" contains a sample of "New World Symphony" written by Maurice White and Verdine White, as performed by Earth, Wind & Fire.

 "Outro" contains a sample of "The Tourist", written by Jason Beck, and performed by Chilly Gonzales.
 "Congratulations" contains a sample of "Viva La Vida", written by Chris Martin, Guy Berryman, Jonny Buckland and Will Champion, as performed by Coldplay.

Personnel
Credits adapted from Tidal.

 40 – mixing, recording engineering (1-15, 17); production (1-3, 7, 14, 15), remixing (4, 9, 11), vocal engineering (13, 17); additional production (18)
 Boi-1da – production (10, 12)
 D10 – production (13, 17)
 Björn Yttling – production (4)
 DJ Screw – production (5)
 Just Blaze – production (6)
 Kanye West – production (8)
 Björn Yttling – production (9)
 Diplo – production (11)
 John Hill – production (11)
 Arthur McArthur – production (12)
 Sebastian Nadal – production (16)
 Megaman – production (18)
 The Peresian Gangster – remixing (11)
 Finis "KY" White – additional vocal engineering (3, 6, 12)
 Cory Mo – additional vocal engineering (12)

Charts

Release history

References

Albums produced by Boi-1da
Albums produced by Diplo
Albums produced by Just Blaze
Albums produced by Kanye West
Albums produced by Noah "40" Shebib
Drake (musician) albums
2009 mixtape albums